Tom Conway (born Thomas Charles Sanders, 15 September 1904 – 22 April 1967) was a British film, television, and radio actor remembered for playing private detectives (including The Falcon, Sherlock Holmes, Bulldog Drummond, and The Saint) and psychiatrists, among other roles.

Conway played "The Falcon" in 10 episodes of the series, taking over from his brother, George Sanders, in The Falcon's Brother (1942), in which they both starred. He also appeared in several Val Lewton films.

Early life
Conway was born in St. Petersburg, Russia. His younger brother was fellow actor George Sanders. Their younger sister, Margaret Sanders, was born in 1912. At the outbreak of the Russian Revolution (1917), the family moved to England, where Conway was educated at Bedales School and Brighton College. He travelled to Northern Rhodesia, where he worked in mining and ranching, then returned to England, appearing in several plays with the Manchester Repertory Company and performing on BBC Radio.

Career

MGM
When he joined his brother in Hollywood, Conway became a contract player for MGM. During this time, he changed his last name from Sanders to Conway. He had small roles in Waterloo Bridge (1940), with only his voice heard, Sky Murder (1941) with Walter Pidgeon, and The Wild Man of Borneo (1941). He had a bigger part in The Trial of Mary Dugan (1941) with Robert Young, then was back to small parts in Free and Easy (1941), The Bad Man (1941) with Wallace Beery and Lionel Barrymore, The People vs. Dr. Kildare (1941) with Lew Ayres and Lionel Barrymore, and Lady Be Good (1941) with Eleanor Powell and Red Skelton.

Conway was a villain in Tarzan's Secret Treasure (1941) with Johnny Weissmuller and Maureen O'Sullivan, Mr. and Mrs. North (1941) with Gracie Allen, and Rio Rita (1942) with Abbott and Costello. He was a murder suspect in Grand Central Murder (1942) with Van Heflin and had an uncredited bit in Mrs. Miniver (1942) with Greer Garson and Walter Pidgeon.

RKO: The Falcon and Val Lewton
At RKO, Conway's brother George Sanders had starred in three popular "B" movies as The Falcon. Sanders tired of the role, so Conway took over as The Falcon's Brother (1942), co-starring with Sanders (Sanders's character was killed off, leaving his brother to assume the mantle of The Falcon). Producer Maurice Geraghty later revealed that RKO executives recruited Conway so they could induce Sanders to make one more Falcon picture, after which the series would end. "So it was astonishing to them when Tom Conway caught on right away and carried the series on -- even outgrossing the pictures George had made." RKO signed Tom Conway to a long-term contract.

Conway followed this success with an excellent role in Cat People (1942), the first of producer Val Lewton's legendary horror cycle. He had the male lead in a second film for Lewton, I Walked with a Zombie (1942), now regarded as a horror classic. Conway was top-billed in Lewton's The Seventh Victim (1943) playing the same role he did in The Cat People though his character was apparently killed in that film.

Between his Falcon and Val Lewton assignments, RKO starred Conway in B mysteries: A Night of Adventure (1944), Two O'Clock Courage (1945), and Criminal Court (1946).

Conway was borrowed by United Artists for Whistle Stop (1946), in which he supported George Raft, Ava Gardner, and Victor McLaglen. In June 1946, Conway obtained a release from his RKO contract. His next film was to be Strange Bedfellows at United Artists.

Freelance actor
On radio, Conway played Sherlock Holmes during the 1946–1947 season of The New Adventures of Sherlock Holmes, following Basil Rathbone's departure from the series. In spite of a similarly refined British accent, Conway was not as well-received as Rathbone by audiences; he played Holmes for only one season.

He was a leading support actor in Lost Honeymoon (1947) and Repeat Performance (1947) for Eagle-Lion, Fun on a Weekend (1947) for United Artists, and One Touch of Venus (1948) for Universal. 

Reliance Pictures, an independent company that distributed through Fox, hired Conway to play Bulldog Drummond in The Challenge (1948) and 13 Lead Soldiers (1948). Independent producer Sam Baerwitz cast Conway in low-budget crime stories released by Fox: The Checkered Coat (1948), Bungalow 13 (1948), I Cheated the Law (1949), and The Great Plane Robbery (1950). 

Conway had support parts in Painting the Clouds with Sunshine (1951) and Bride of the Gorilla (1951). He went back to leads for Confidence Girl (1952), and was a villain in Tarzan and the She-Devil (1953).

In 1951, he replaced Vincent Price as star of the radio mystery series The Saint, portrayed by Sanders on film a decade earlier.

From 1951 to 1954, Conway played debonair British police detective Mark Saber, who worked in the homicide division of a large American city, in the ABC television series entitled Inspector Mark Saber – Homicide Detective. In 1957, the series resumed on NBC, renamed Saber of London, with Donald Gray in the title role.

Conway went to England to star as Berkeley Gray's private detective Norman Conquest in Park Plaza 605 (released in America as Norman Conquest, 1953), and (using his own name instead of the Conquest tag) Blood Orange (1953). He had a support part in Paris Model (1953) and a minor role in Prince Valiant (1954), but leads in the British Barbados Quest (1955), Breakaway (1955), and The Last Man to Hang (1956).

In 1956, brothers Tom Conway and George Sanders appeared (as brothers) in the film Death of a Scoundrel, with the star Sanders killing supporting player Conway.

In America, Conway co-starred in The She-Creature (1956) and Voodoo Woman (1957). In England, he did Operation Murder (1957). In 1956, he was briefly hospitalized for an operation.

Conway performed in the Alfred Hitchcock Presents episode "The Glass Eye" (1957) as Max Collodi, receiving critical praise.

Final years
Conway had supporting roles on The Betty Hutton Show television series (1959–60) and in the feature films The Atomic Submarine (1959), and 12 to the Moon (1960). He provided his voice for Disney's 101 Dalmatians (1961) as a quizmaster in What's My Crime?—a parody of the game show What's My Line?—and as a collie that offers the dalmatians shelter in a barn, later guiding them home. His wife at the time, Queenie Leonard, voiced a cow in the barn.

His final television appearance was in the Perry Mason episode, "The Case of the Simple Simon" (1964), playing the role of Guy Penrose.

Decline and death
Despite having been financially successful during his 24-year film career, Conway later struggled to make ends meet. Failing eyesight and alcoholism took their toll on him in his last years. 

His first marriage ended in divorce in 1953.  His second wife (Leonard) divorced him in 1963 because of his drinking problem. His alcoholism also cost him his relationship with his brother George Sanders, who broke off all contact with him. 

Conway underwent cataract surgery during the winter of 1964–1965. In September 1965, he briefly returned to the headlines, having been discovered living in a $2-a-day room in a Venice, Los Angeles flophouse. Gifts, contributions, and offers of aid poured in for a time. Conway estimated he had earned $900,000 in his career, but was broke. "I don't particularly want to act," he said. He said he lost his last $15,000 to swindlers in a lumber deal. Lew Ayres paid his rent.

His last years were marked with hospitalizations. Former sister-in-law Zsa Zsa Gabor paid Conway a visit there and gave him $200. "Tip the nurses a little bit so they'll be good to you," she told him. The following day, the hospital called her to say that Conway had left with the $200, gone to his girlfriend's house, and become gravely sick in her bed. On April 22, 1967, Tom Conway died from cirrhosis of the liver at the age of 62. His funeral was held in London.

Filmography

Waterloo Bridge (1940) (film debut) (voice)
Sky Murder (1940) as Andrew Hendon
The Great Meddler (1940) as Henry Bergh 
The Wild Man of Borneo (1941) as Actor in Film Scene (uncredited)
The Trial of Mary Dugan (1941) as Edgar Wayne
Free and Easy (1941) as Captain Ferris
The Bad Man (1941) as Morgan Pell
The People vs. Dr. Kildare (1941) as Mr. Channing
Lady Be Good (1941) as Mr. Blanton
Tarzan's Secret Treasure (1941) as Medford
Mr. and Mrs. North (1942) as Louis Berex
Rio Rita (1942) as Maurice Craindall
Grand Central Murder (1942) as Frankie Ciro
Mrs. Miniver (1942) as Man (uncredited)
The Falcon's Brother (1942) as Tom Lawrence
Cat People (1942) as Dr. Louis Judd
The Falcon Strikes Back (1943) as Tom Lawrence
I Walked with a Zombie (1943) as Paul Holland
The Falcon in Danger (1943) as Tom Lawrence
The Seventh Victim (1943) as Dr. Louis Judd
The Falcon and the Co-eds (1943) as Tom Lawrence
The Falcon Out West (1944) as Tom Lawrence
A Night of Adventure (1944) as Mark Latham
The Falcon in Mexico (1944) as Tom Lawrence
The Falcon in Hollywood (1944) as Tom Lawrence
Two O'Clock Courage (1945) as Ted 'Step' Allison
The Falcon in San Francisco (1945) as Tom Lawrence
Whistle Stop (1946) as Lew Lentz
The Falcon's Alibi (1946) as Tom Lawrence
Criminal Court (1946) as Steve Barnes
The Falcon's Adventure (1946) as Tom Lawrence
Lost Honeymoon (1947) as Dr. Robert 'Bob' Davis
Fun on a Weekend (1947) as Jefferson Van Orsdale Jr.
Repeat Performance (1947) as John Friday
The Challenge (1948) as Capt. Hugh 'Bulldog' Drummond
13 Lead Soldiers (1948) as Capt. Hugh 'Bulldog' Drummond
The Checkered Coat (1948) as Dr. Michael Madden
One Touch of Venus (1948) as Whitfield Savory
Bungalow 13 (1948) as Christopher Adams
I Cheated the Law (1949) as John Campbell
The Great Plane Robbery (1950) as Ned Johnson
Painting the Clouds with Sunshine (1951) as Bennington Lansing
Bride of the Gorilla (1951) as Dr. Viet
Confidence Girl (1952) as Roger Kingsley
Peter Pan (1953) as Narrator (voice)
Tarzan and the She-Devil (1953) as Fidel
Park Plaza 605 (1953) as Norman Conquest
Blood Orange (1953) as Tom Conway, private investigator
Paris Model (1953) as Maharajah of Kim-Kepore
Prince Valiant (1954) as Sir Kay
Barbados Quest (1955) as Tom Martin
Breakaway (1955) as Tom 'Duke' Martin
The She-Creature (1956) as Timothy Chappel
The Last Man to Hang (1956) as Sir Roderick Strood
Death of a Scoundrel (1956) as Gerry Monte aka Sabourin
Operation Murder (1957) as Dr. Wayne
Voodoo Woman (1957) as Dr. Roland Gerard
The Atomic Submarine (1959) as Sir Ian Hunt
12 to the Moon (1960) as Dr. Feodor Orloff
One Hundred and One Dalmatians (1961) as Quizmaster / Collie (voice)
What a Way to Go! (1964) as Lord Kensington (final film) (uncredited)

References

External links
 
 
 
 

1904 births
1967 deaths
English male radio actors
Burials at Chapel of the Pines Crematory
Deaths from cirrhosis
English male film actors
English male television actors
English male voice actors
English people of Estonian descent
English people of German descent
English people of Scottish descent
British expatriate male actors in the United States
People educated at Bedales School
People educated at Brighton College
People from Brighton
20th-century English male actors
Emigrants from the Russian Empire to the United Kingdom
Alcohol-related deaths in California
Metro-Goldwyn-Mayer contract players
RKO Pictures contract players